Thomas "Tully" Craig (1897 – 30 January 1963) was a Scottish footballer who is best known for his time with Rangers, and also played for Celtic earlier in his career. He was a versatile player who could play up front, in midfield or defence.

Playing career
Born in Laurieston and with links to the small town of Tullibody from which his nickname derived, Craig was signed by Celtic from Junior side Grange Rovers in June 1919 and made his first team debut for the club in a 3–2 league win at Kilmarnock on 17 January 1920. The left-half impressed on his debut, scoring two goals, but he was deemed to be too lightweight by manager Willie Maley and consequently spent most of his time at Celtic Park in the reserves.

Maley was only too pleased to offload the player to Alloa Athletic in an exchange deal which saw Craig and two other Celts swapped for Willie Crilley. While Crilley would disappoint in the Hoops, Craig was a huge success at Alloa, so much so that after only one season Rangers bought him for a fee of seven hundred and fifty pounds.

In eleven years at Ibrox Craig played a significant role in seven Scottish League title-winning campaigns and was involved in three more to a smaller degree, won two Scottish Cups in 1928 and 1930 (also playing in the 1929 final, in which he became the first player to fail from the penalty spot in the event's history), two Glasgow Cups and four Charity Cups. He retired from playing in 1935.

Craig won eight Scotland caps between 1927 and 1930. He also represented the Scottish Football League XI.

Managerial career
After his retirement he went on to manage both Falkirk from 1935 to 1950 and Linfield for a season.

See also
List of Scotland national football team captains 
Played for Celtic and Rangers

References

External links

1897 births
1963 deaths
Scotland international footballers
Rangers F.C. players
Celtic F.C. players
Alloa Athletic F.C. players
Scottish footballers
Scottish football managers
Falkirk F.C. managers
Linfield F.C. managers
Scottish Junior Football Association players
Association football wing halves
Association football utility players
Footballers from Falkirk (council area)
Scottish Football League players
Scottish Football League representative players
Scottish Football League managers
NIFL Premiership managers